is a railway station in Adachi, Tokyo, Japan. It is operated by private railway operator Tobu Railway.

Lines
The station is served by the Tobu Skytree Line and Tobu Daishi Line.

Station layout
The station consists of three island platforms serving six tracks.

Platforms

Adjacent stations

History
The station opened on 27 August 1899.

From 17 March 2012, station numbering was introduced on all Tobu lines, with Nishiarai Station becoming "TS-13".

References

External links

 Nishiarai Station information 

Tobu Skytree Line
Tobu Daishi Line
Stations of Tobu Railway
Railway stations in Tokyo
Railway stations in Japan opened in 1899